Llewelyn David Bevan (11 September 1842 – 19 July 1918) was a Congregational church minister and academic active in Australia.

Early life
Bevan was born in Llanelly, Carmarthen, Wales, son of Hopkin Bevan, actuary, and his wife Eliza, née Davies, a Congregational minister's daughter. Bevan had plans for a legal career, but was converted by the preaching of Henry Grattan Guinness. Bevan studied at New College, then at the University of London (B.A., 1862 and LL.B. 1865) .

Ordained in 1865, Bevan assisted Thomas Binney at King's Weigh House Chapel; then 1869-75 was minister of Tottenham Court Chapel and the building, one of the largest Congregational churches in London, was often crowded.

Bevan married Louisa Jane, née Willett in Southampton on 2 April 1870.
In 1873 Bevan won the Marylebone seat on the London School Board supporting 'free, compulsory and secular' education. In 1874 Bevan visited the United States of America and ministered at the Central Church, Brooklyn for two months. Bevan subsequently received offers from several churches including the Collins Street Independent Church, Melbourne, Australia, before accepting to minister at the Brick Presbyterian Church (New York City) in 1876. Bevan became moderator of the New York Presbytery in 1880. Awarded a doctorate by Princeton University in 1882, Bevan moved back to London where he was urged to stand for Parliament. Partly because his family's health often suffered during the winter months, Bevan decided instead to accept a fourth offer to minister at the Collins Street Independent Church.

Australia
Bevan and his family arrived in Melbourne aboard the Valetta on 6 November 1886, Bevan was to be a leader of Protestant intellectual life in Melbourne for the next 23 years. Bevan was chairman of the Congregational Union of Victoria and a vice-president of Congregational international councils at London in 1891 and Boston in 1899. He was also chairman of the jury of education at the Melbourne Centennial International Exhibition, 1888, for which he was honoured by the French government; in 1891 Bevan served on a parliamentary committee to study the educational systems of Germany, France, and the United States. Bevan was also a supporter of Federation, some urged him to contest the seat of Corangamite but he declined. Bevan was also a collector of books and antique ceramics; and a recognized student of Henrik Ibsen.
In February 1910 Bevan became principal of Parkin College, Adelaide, a position he held until his death.

Late life
Bevan was a sufferer of diabetes and ultimately peripheral vascular disease and died on 19 July 1918, survived by his wife, three sons and four daughters.

References

External links
 Bevan, Llewelyn David entry at the Dictionary of Welsh Biography
 Biographical cuttings on Llewelyn David Bevan at National Library of Australia

1842 births
1918 deaths
Welsh emigrants to colonial Australia
Congregationalist religious workers
Members of the London School Board
People from Llanelli
Australian book and manuscript collectors